Peter Pollen (October 26, 1927 – January 3, 2017) was a Canadian politician from British Columbia who was the mayor of Victoria, B.C. from 1971 to 1975 and from 1981 to 1985.

He was raised in Saskatchewan and Ontario and came to Victoria at the age of 34 to assist a local Ford dealer. Instead, the dealer persuaded him to take over the dealership. Pollen ran unsuccessfully as the British Columbia Social Credit Party candidate in the 1968 by-election in Oak Bay. From 1985 to 1986, he was the leader of the British Columbia Progressive Conservative Party. In 2011, the Hallmark Society, an association dedicated to heritage preservation in Victoria, presented Pollen with a merit award for "his contributions to the heritage fabric of Victoria".

He died on January 3, 2017, at the age of 89.

References

1927 births
2017 deaths
Mayors of Victoria, British Columbia
British Columbia Conservative Party leaders
British Columbia Social Credit Party politicians